Petru Stoianov (born October 29, 1939 in Vinga, Arad County) is a Romanian composer.

Known as a modern composer, he signed a unique suite of lieds on Mihai Eminescu's poems.
Petru Stoianov is a university professor, Ph.D. and The Dean of the Music Academy in the biggest Romanian University "Spiru Haret". He is married to a musicologist, Carmen Stoianov, who is also a university professor, Ph.D.

External links
http://www.cimec.ro/MUZICA/Pers/PetruStoianov.html 

Romanian composers
Living people
1939 births
People from Arad County